Hypopyra contractipennis is a species of moth of the family Erebidae. It is found in northern Vietnam and in Laos.

This species has a wingspan of 50 mm.

References

Moths described in 1912
Hypopyra